Lake Jordan, Alabama
 Lake Jordan (Montana)
 Jordan Lake, North Carolina